Three Lakeway Center, in Metairie, Louisiana, is a 34-story, -tall skyscraper.  It is the tallest building in Jefferson Parish, Louisiana and is the 13th tallest building in the Greater New Orleans area.  It is also one of the tallest buildings in the unincorporated areas of the United States.

Location
3838 North Causeway Boulevard, Metairie, LA

See also
 List of tallest buildings in New Orleans
 List of tallest buildings in Metairie

External links
 on Emporis.com

Buildings and structures completed in 1987
Skyscraper office buildings in Metairie, Louisiana